Gronówko may refer to the following places:
Gronówko, Greater Poland Voivodeship (west-central Poland)
Gronówko, Warmian-Masurian Voivodeship (north Poland)
Gronówko, West Pomeranian Voivodeship (north-west Poland)